The 1927 Argentine Primera División was the 36th season of top-flight football in Argentina. Thirty-four teams were eligible to play the tournament (8 from official AFA and 26 from dissident AAm). It was also established that the 14 founder members of AAm would not be relegated in case of finishing in the last position. Therefore, the last four teams at the end of the season (Tigre, San Isidro, Estudiantes (BA) and Porteño) remained in Primera.

The season began on March 19, 1927, and ended on April 8, 1928. San Lorenzo won its third league title.

Final table

References

Argentine Primera División seasons
1927 in Argentine football
1927 in South American football